Pronyssa is a genus of beetles in the family Cicindelidae, containing the following species:

 Pronyssa andrsi J.Moravec & Wiesner, 2001
 Pronyssa assamensis Sawada & Wiesner, 1999 
 Pronyssa ingridae Sawada &Wiesner, 1999 
 Pronyssa kraatzi (W. Horn, 1899) 
 Pronyssa manaslucola Wiesner, 2003 
 Pronyssa montanea Sawada & Wiesner, 1999 
 Pronyssa nodicollis Bates, 1874

References

Cicindelidae